Elgood's is a family-owned regional brewery in Wisbech, Cambridgeshire, England, which was established in 1795.

History
The North Brink Brewery, on the north bank of the River Nene in Wisbech, was established in 1795 and purchased six years later by William Watson and Abraham Usill. Both owners recognised the importance of acquiring public houses that would sell the produce of the brewery instead of brewing their own and eventually raised the number of tied houses to forty. Watson died in 1836, Phillips, Tibbitts and Phillips took over the brewery.  

The partnership failed and the business was put up for auction in 1853.

Phillips continued until 1877 when the business was auctioned.

In 1878, it came under the control of the Elgood family.

In 1882 two pubs were advertised to be let 

In 1886 George Harrison, the junior partner to John Elgood was reported in financial difficulties.

After it was bought by the Elgood family, the building was renovated in the Georgian style and most of it is still in use today. It was one of the first classic Georgian breweries outside London. Nigel and Anne Elgood's three daughters, Belinda Sutton, Jennifer Everall and Claire Simpson, are the fifth generation of the family to run the business.

In the First World War, the brewery was fire-bombed by a Zeppelin, and the shell of the bomb can still be viewed in the brewery museum.  In the Second World War, some of the metal vats and tuns were melted down, but the brewery retained its 17th-century Eagle Foundry (Wisbech) liquor vat.

The brewery was listed as Grade II in 1983. In the brewery gardens there is a landscaped mound, on top of which stands Brewery House. This mound is the outside of the original cold store for the beer. In the First and Second World Wars the cellar doubled as an air-raid shelter. Today the cellar is unused, but the entrance is still visible from the current cold store. The gardens, which contain 200-year-old trees, a lake and a maze, are promoted by the Campaign to Protect Rural England.

Redundancy notices were issued in October 2020 as the family-owned company struggled to keep its head above water during the Covid19 pandemic .

Beers
Apple & Vanilla wheat beer 
Blackberry Porter
Black Dog - 2006 CAMRA Silver Award for mild
Cambridge - 2006 CAMRA Gold Award for bitter
Cambridge IPA Dark
Cherry wheat beer 
Coolship Fruit
Coolship mango
Coolship Sour ale
Greyhound
Golden Newt
Pageant
FeElgood
The FeElgood Factor - chocolate flavoured, no longer in production
Indian Summer
Plum Porter
Warrior bitter
Wenceslas Winter Warmer
Double Swan - proceeds from Double Swan are donated to the Wildfowl & Wetlands Trust (WWT) reserve in Welney
Windsor Knot - a special brew run to celebrate the royal wedding of Prince William and Catherine Middleton

Elgood Flag Porter is based on a traditional 19th century British recipe using yeast that was salvaged from containers or barrels in a ship that sank in the English Channel in 1825. In 1988, several bottles of the brew were obtained from the sunken ship in the Channel. They were still in their original containers, with their wood stoppers and wax seals intact. When opened, the beer were said to taste like wet boots according to brewer and microbiologist, Dr Keith Thomas. Upon examining the beer under a microscope, he found a small percentage of the yeast was still alive. He spent months growing this yeast and  brewed a porter using an 1850 recipe.

References

External links 
 Elgood & Sons Ltd

Wisbech
Companies based in Cambridgeshire
Breweries in England
British companies established in 1795
Food and drink companies established in 1795
1795 establishments in England